Comas may refer to:
 Comas District, Lima, Peru
 Comas District, Concepción, Peru
 Érik Comas, a former Formula One driver from France
 Chief Comas (fl. 1809–1814) a 19th-century Potawatomi chieftain
 The College of Management Academic Studies, the largest college in Israel.